2-Bekat is a station of the Tashkent Metro on Chilonzor Line. It was put into operation on December 26, 2020, as part of the third section of the Chilanzar line, between Olmazor and 5-Bekat. The station is located between 1-Bekat and 3-Bekat.

The planned name for the station was Toshkent halqa yo‘li (Tashkent Circle Road), however, the station was opened as 2-Bekat, which simply means Station-2.

References

Tashkent Metro stations
Railway stations opened in 2020